Charda Suraj is a 1982 Lollywood action film. It was directed by Basheer Rana and produced by Mohammad Naeem Khan, starring Sultan Rahi, Mumtaz, Mustafa Qureshi and Ilyas Kashmiri.

Cast
 Sultan Rahi as Dilawar
 Mumtaz
 Iqbal Hassan
 Aliya Begum
 Mustafa Qureshi
 Najma Mehboob
 Iqbal Bukhari
 Ladla
 Afzaal Ahmad
 Rangeela
 Asif Khan
 Ilyas Kashmiri as Chaudhry Baland Bakhat
 Abid Kashmiri
 Jamil Babar
 Salya Gul
 Saba
 Saeed Firdousi
 Jaggi
 Khayaam
 Altaf Khan
 Tahira Azmi
 Iqbal Durrani
 Badal
 Haq Nawaz
 Ali Nasir

Music
The music of the film Charhda Suraj is by musician Tafoo. The lyrics are penned by Khawaja Pervez. The playback singers were:
 Noor Jehan
 Naheed Akhtar
 Inayat Hussain Bhatti
 Shaukat Ali

References

External links

1982 films
Pakistani action films
Punjabi-language Pakistani films
1980s Punjabi-language films
1982 action films